Zarrinabad (also Romanized as Zarrīnābād; also known as Jārīābād) is a village in Qaedrahmat Rural District, Zagheh District, Khorramabad County, Lorestan Province, Iran. At the 2006 census, its population was 286, in 64 families.

References 

Towns and villages in Khorramabad County